"Rock Me Tonight (For Old Times Sake)" is the debut single for Harlem-born R&B/soul singer Freddie Jackson.   Taken from the namesake debut title album, Rock Me Tonight, the popular ballad was written and produced by Paul Laurence.  It was the top-selling R&B single for 1985 and was Jackson's first of ten entries to hit the number-one spot on the R&B chart.

"Rock Me Tonight (For Old Times Sake)" was number one for six weeks on the Billboard Hot Black Singles chart and reached number 18 on the Hot 100 singles chart. It also reached number 18 in the UK Singles Chart in March 1986.

See also
 List of number-one R&B singles of 1985 (U.S.)
 Billboard Year-End

References
 

1985 singles
Freddie Jackson songs
Capitol Records singles
1985 songs
Songs written by Paul Laurence
1980s ballads